La Carvas Rashad Davis (born October 28, 1980) is an American mixed martial artist who most recently competed in the Bantamweight division of Bellator MMA. A professional competitor since 2006, Davis has also formerly competed for the Quad Cities Silverbacks in the IFL, Affliction Entertainment, Titan FC, and the WEC.

Background
Born and raised in Kansas City, Missouri, Davis competed in high school wrestling and was talented, going on to continue his wrestling career at Labette Community College and Missouri Valley College. After graduating college, Davis began training in mixed martial arts.

Mixed martial arts career

Early career
Davis made his MMA debut in 2006, defeating Nick Wright in VFC 12. His professional MMA career has made him retire from a steady job as a wrestling coach at Pratt Community College, moving to the Quad Cities to train under Pat Miletich at his Mixed Martial School. He has competed for the Featherweight Grand Prix title, but there he suffered the first loss of his professional career, to Wagnney Fabiano.

In 2008, Davis was intended to debut in WEC 35 as a replacement to the injured Cub Swanson, who broke his hand at training. He was supposed to fight against Hiroyuki Takaya, but the fight was cancelled for unspecified reasons.

World Extreme Cagefighting
Davis made his WEC debut against fellow WEC newcomer Javier Vazquez on August 9, 2009 at WEC 42. He won via split decision.

He returned to the WEC only four months later, defeating previously unbeaten Diego Nunes via unanimous decision at WEC 44. A victory which was also considered a major upset, Nunes was a 3 to 1 favorite coming into the bout.

On March 6, 2010, Davis defeated Deividas Taurosevičius via majority decision at WEC 47, Thus solidifying his name as a top 10 contender in the WEC featherweight division.

In his fourth WEC outing, Davis fought top contender Josh Grispi at WEC 49. In the first round of the fight, Grispi sunk in a deep guillotine choke as Davis was shooting for a takedown. Grispi managed to choke Davis unconscious and was declared the winner via technical submission.

Davis looked to bounce back from his previous defeat by taking on Brazilian Jiu Jitsu black belt Raphael Assunção. The fight took place on November 11, 2010 at WEC 52. Davis lost via unanimous decision. For the first time in his WEC career Davis was the favorite coming into the fight.

After losing his second straight fight Davis was released from Zuffa following the UFC/WEC merger.

Independent promotions
In September 2008, Davis signed a year-long three-fight non-exclusive contract with Affliction, Davis made his Affliction debut on January 24, 2009 where he defeated journeyman Bao Quach by unanimous decision after a back and forth fight. His contract was later terminated after the company closed.

Davis has been announced as a participant in World Victory Road's Featherweight Grand Prix. In the first round of the tournament Davis was upset and thoroughly defeated by Michihiro Omigawa via unanimous decision.

After his release from the WEC, Davis returned home to Kansas City to work on his training where he eventually decided to drop down to the bantamweight division. Davis made his bantamweight debut on May 25, 2012 at Titan Fighting Championships 22 against Bill Kamery. Davis defeated Kamery in the second round via TKO putting him back in the win column for first time in over two years.

Davis defeated Jacob Akin on February 22, 2013, at Kansas City Fighting Alliance 5 via TKO due to punches in round one.

Davis defeated Dominic Blanco on March 30, 2013, at Victory Fighting Championship 39 via TKO due to a liver kick in round one.

Davis defeated James Saville on June 29, 2013, at GWC: The British Invasion via unanimous decision.

Bellator MMA
Davis made his debut with Bellator MMA on March 21, 2014 at Bellator 113.  He faced Tory Bogguess and won via guillotine choke submission in the closing seconds of the first round.

Davis next faced promotional newcomer Zeilton Rodrigues at Bellator 124 on September 12, 2014. He won the fight via unanimous decision.

Davis faced Hideo Tokoro at Bellator 135 on March 27, 2015. He won the back-and-forth fight via split decision. He still went on to do the interview after he broke his jaw.

Davis faced the former Bellator Bantamweight Champion, Joe Warren in the main event of Bellator 143 on September 25, 2015. He lost the fight via unanimous decision.

On February 20, 2018 it was announced that Bellator had released Davis from the promotion.

Personal life
Davis has a son as well as one step-son and one step-daughter with wife Kylie Shepard

Championships and accomplishments
Victory Fighting Championship
VFC Bantamweight Championship (One time)
Yahoo! Sports
2015 Best Fight of the Half-Year vs. Hideo Tokoro

Mixed martial arts record

|-
|Loss
|align=center| 23–8
|Marcos Galvão
|Decision (split)
|Bellator 166
|
|align=center|3
|align=center|5:00
|Thackerville, Oklahoma, United States
|
|-
|Loss
|align=center| 23–7
|Joe Warren
|Decision (unanimous)
|Bellator 143
|
|align=center|3
|align=center|5:00
|Hidalgo, Texas, United States
|
|-
|Win
|align=center| 23–6
|Hideo Tokoro
|Decision (split)
|Bellator 135
|
|align=center|3
|align=center|5:00
|Thackerville, Oklahoma, United States
|
|-
|Win
|align=center| 22–6
|Zeilton Rodrigues
|Decision (unanimous)
|Bellator 124
|
|align=center|3
|align=center|5:00
|Plymouth Township, Michigan, United States
|
|-
|Win
|align=center|21–6
| Tory Bogguess
|Submission (guillotine choke)
|Bellator 113
|
|align=center|1
|align=center|4:58
|Mulvane, Kansas, United States
|
|-
|Loss
|align=center|20–6
| Ryan Roberts
|Decision (split)
|Victory Fighting Championship 41
|
|align=center|5
|align=center|5:00
|Ralston, Nebraska, United States
|
|-
|Win
|align=center|20–5
| James Saville
|Decision (unanimous)
|GWC: The British Invasion: U.S. vs. U.K.
|
|align=center|3
|align=center|5:00
|Kansas City, Missouri, United States
|
|-
|Win
|align=center|19–5
| Dominic Blanco
|TKO (liver kick)
|Victory Fighting Championship 39
|
|align=center|1
|align=center|2:44
|Omaha, Nebraska, United States
|
|-
|Win
|align=center|18–5
| Jacob Akin
|TKO (punches)
|Kansas City Fighting Alliance 5
|
|align=center|1
|align=center|2:18
|Kansas City, Kansas, United States
|
|-
|Win
|align=center|17–5
| Bill Kamery
|TKO (punches)
|Titan FC 22
|
|align=center|2
|align=center|2:59
|Kansas City, Kansas, United States
|
|-
|Loss
|align=center|16–5
| Christian Uflacker
|Decision (split)
|Hoosier Fight Club 10
|
|align=center|3
|align=center|5:00
|Valparaiso, Indiana, United States
|
|-
|Loss
|align=center|16–4
| Raphael Assunção
|Decision (unanimous)
|WEC 52
|
|align=center|3
|align=center|5:00
|Las Vegas, Nevada, United States
|
|-
|Loss
|align=center|16–3
| Josh Grispi
|Technical Submission (guillotine choke)
|WEC 49
|
|align=center|1
|align=center|2:33
|Edmonton, Alberta, Canada
|
|-
|Win
|align=center|16–2
| Deividas Taurosevičius
|Decision (majority)
|WEC 47
|
|align=center|3
|align=center|5:00
|Columbus, Ohio, United States
|
|-
|Win
|align=center|15–2
| Diego Nunes
|Decision (unanimous)
|WEC 44
|
|align=center|3
|align=center|5:00
|Las Vegas, Nevada, United States
|
|-
|Win
|align=center|14–2
| Javier Vazquez
|Decision (split)
|WEC 42
|
|align=center|3
|align=center|5:00
|Las Vegas, Nevada, United States
|
|-
|Loss
|align=center|13–2
| Michihiro Omigawa
|Decision (unanimous)
|World Victory Road Presents: Sengoku 7
|
|align=center|3
|align=center|5:00
|Tokyo, Japan
|
|-
|Win
|align=center|13–1
| Bao Quach
|Decision (unanimous)
|Affliction: Day of Reckoning
|
|align=center|3
|align=center|5:00
|Anaheim, California, United States
|
|-
|Win
|align=center|12–1
| Billy Kidd
|Submission (bulldog choke)
|Adrenaline MMA 2: Miletich vs. Denny
|
|align=center|1
|align=center|2:52
|Moline, Illinois, United States
|
|-
|Win
|align=center|11–1
| Josh Bernal
|TKO (punches)
|Conquest FC 1
|
|align=center|1
|align=center|4:07
|Des Moines, Iowa, United States
|
|-
|Win
|align=center|10–1
| Rafael Dias
|KO (head kick)
|IFL: New Jersey
|
|align=center|3
|align=center|3:56
|East Rutherford, New Jersey, United States
|
|-
|Loss
|align=center|9–1
| Wagnney Fabiano
|Submission (armbar)
|IFL: World Grand Prix Finals
|
|align=center|1
|align=center|3:38
|Uncasville, Connecticut, United States
|
|-
|Win
|align=center|9–0
| Conor Heun
|Decision (split)
|IFL: 2007 Semi-Finals
|
|align=center|3
|align=center|4:00
|East Rutherford, New Jersey, United States
|
|-
|Win
|align=center|8–0
| Dan Sullivan
|TKO (punches)
|Titan FC 8
|
|align=center|1
|align=center|3:18
|Kansas City, Kansas, United States
|
|-
|Win
|align=center|7–0
| Jay Estrada
|Submission (guillotine choke)
|IFC: Chicago
|
|align=center|2
|align=center|0:33
|Chicago, Illinois, United States
|
|-
|Win
|align=center|6–0
| George Henderson
|TKO (submission to punches)
|Titan FC 7
|
|align=center|1
|align=center|1:10
|Kansas City, Kansas, United States
|
|-
|Win
|align=center|5–0
| John T. Smith
|TKO (punches)
|Titan FC 6
|
|align=center|1
|align=center|0:36
|Kansas City, Kansas, United States
|
|-
|Win
|align=center|4–0
| Tim Gorman
|Submission (guillotine choke)
|Titan FC 5
|
|align=center|1
|align=center|2:52
|Kansas City, Kansas, United States
|
|-
|Win
|align=center|3–0
| Mike Lindquist
|Submission (rear-naked choke)
|Titan FC 4
|
|align=center|1
|align=center|1:13
|Kansas City, Kansas, United States
|
|-
|Win
|align=center|2–0
| Ace Anderson
|TKO (submission to punches)
|Titan FC 2
|
|align=center|1
|align=center|0:52
|Topeka, Kansas, United States
|
|-
|Win
|align=center|1–0
| Nick Wright
|TKO (punches)
|VFC 12: Warpath
|
|align=center|2
|align=center|N/A
|Council Bluffs, Iowa, United States
|

See also
List of male mixed martial artists
List of current Bellator fighters

References

External links
 
 https://web.archive.org/web/20090108212331/http://www.mmamadness.com/fighter/3945
 Gym Website: https://web.archive.org/web/20111213125703/http://www.highdavismma.com/

Living people
American male mixed martial artists
Mixed martial artists from Kansas
Featherweight mixed martial artists
Bantamweight mixed martial artists
Mixed martial artists utilizing freestyle wrestling
1980 births
Sportspeople from Kansas City, Kansas
Missouri Valley College alumni